VHS is the debut studio album by American rock band X Ambassadors, released on June 30, 2015 by KIDinaKORNER and Interscope Records. The album has spawned three singles, "Renegades", "Unsteady", and "Low Life". A special edition titled VHS 2.0 was released on June 10, 2016 with five additional tracks and the interludes removed. It is the only album to feature Noah Feldshuh before he took an indefinite hiatus in 2016.

Track listing

Personnel

X Ambassadors 
 Sam Harris – lead and backing vocals, acoustic, bass and electric guitars, saxophone, additional percussion
 Casey Harris – piano, backing vocals, keyboards, synthesizers
 Adam Levin – drums, percussion
 Noah Feldshuh – bass and electric guitars, backing vocals

Additional musicians 
 Jamie N Commons – additional guitar and vocals (on "Jungle" and "Low Life")
 Imagine Dragons – additional vocals and instrumentation (on "Fear")

Charts

Weekly charts

Year-end charts

Certifications

Release history

References 

2015 debut albums
X Ambassadors albums
Interscope Records albums
Albums produced by Alex da Kid
Kidinakorner albums